The 2013 season was Western New York Flash's sixth season of existence, and the first in which they competed in the National Women's Soccer League, the top division of women's soccer in the United States.

Club

Current roster

Team management

Match results

Pre-season

Regular season

Playoffs

Standings

Results summary

Results by round

Statistics

Transfers

See also
 2013 National Women's Soccer League season

References

Western New York Flash seasons
Western New York Flash
Western New York Flash
Western New York Flash